Cary G. Peterson (born February 10, 1935), was an American politician who was a Republican member of the Utah House of Representatives and Utah State Senate. He also served as Utah Commissioner of Agriculture from 1993 to 2005.

References

1935 births
Living people
Republican Party members of the Utah House of Representatives
Republican Party Utah state senators
People from Utah County, Utah
Farmers from Utah